Cylindilla is a genus of longhorn beetles of the subfamily Lamiinae.

Species 
Cylindilla contains the following species:

 Cylindilla grisescens Bates, 1884
 Cylindilla inornata (Gressitt, 1951)
 Cylindilla makiharai Hasegawa, 1992

References

Desmiphorini